Wayne is an unincorporated community centered in Delaware County, Pennsylvania, on the Main Line, a series of highly affluent Philadelphia suburbs located along the railroad tracks of the Pennsylvania Railroad and one of the wealthiest areas in the nation. While the center of Wayne is in Radnor Township, Wayne extends into both Tredyffrin Township in Chester County and Upper Merion Township in Montgomery County. The center of Wayne was designated the Downtown Wayne Historic District in 2012.  Considering the large area served by the Wayne post office, the community may extend slightly into Easttown Township, Chester County, as well.

The center of the Wayne business district is the intersection of Lancaster Avenue and Wayne Avenue, its main street. The historic Wayne station is located one block north of this intersection.  The Wayne business district also includes a post office, a cinema, a hotel, a library, the new Radnor Middle School, and several banks, stores, restaurants, cafes, bars and other commercial establishments. Other institutions and attractions in Wayne include the Wayne Hotel, Chanticleer Garden, and the Valley Forge Military Academy and College.

History

Wayne's development began when a railroad stop called Cleaver's Landing was established.  It was renamed Wayne Station after General Anthony Wayne.  Parcels in the area totaling  were bought by banker J.H. Askin, where he built a mansion named "Louella" after his daughters Louisa and Ella. "Louella" was described as an 80-room stone building with a large porch overlooking manicured lawn. His and surrounding land were bought in 1880 by banker A.J. Drexel and newspaper editor G.W. Childs, to form a larger development they called Wayne Estate.  More homes and a hotel were then built. In a brochure from 1887 about their development they noted they had provided Wayne with "water, light and drainage — the three great conveniences of a large city — by the most approved modern methods." They described Wayne Estate as follows:

The suburban village known as Wayne, on the Pennsylvania Railroad, fourteen miles from Philadelphia, differs so much from the ordinary town allowed to grow up hap-hazard and to develop conveniences as population increases, that it is necessary, in describing it as it appears, to keep in mind some facts about its history.

Wayne is not an accidental aggregation of cottages; it is a town built by design, and provided at the start with all the conveniences to which residents of cities are accustomed and which they are so apt to miss and long for when they go into the country or even into the suburbs of a great city. The scheme of the town was well thought out and planned before any of the new cottages were built, and, as it was undertaken by liberal gentlemen of abundant means, no expense was spared in the preliminary municipal work.

The Chanticleer Garden, Downtown Wayne Historic District, North Wayne Historic District, Pennsylvania Railroad Station at Wayne, South Wayne Historic District and Wayne Hotel are all located on the National Register of Historic Places.

Geography
Wayne is located on the Main Line (the Paoli/Thorndale Line on SEPTA Regional Rail).  The central business district of Wayne is located at the intersection of Lancaster and Wayne Avenues in Radnor Township, Delaware County, Pennsylvania.  The area served by the Wayne ZIP code (19087) is large and encompasses areas both in Radnor Township, Delaware County and in the neighboring adjacent municipalities of Upper Merion in Montgomery County and Tredyffrin in Chester County, including the communities of Radnor, Strafford, St. Davids, and Chesterbrook.

Transportation
St. Davids station, Wayne station, and Strafford station on the Paoli/Thorndale SEPTA Line are in Wayne.

Demographics

Since Wayne is neither an incorporated area nor a census-designated place, all the data is for the ZIP code 19087. As of the census of 2010, there were 32,225 people and 12,754 households residing in the community. The median age was 40.8. The racial makeup of the community was 85.5% White, 7.9% Asian and 5.3% African American, while 3.7% of the population was Hispanic or Latino of any race. The median income for a household in the community was $118,801, and 5.1% of the population was below the poverty line.

Economy
Teleflex, Kenexa, and DLL Group (U.S.) are based in Wayne.

Education

Elementary and high school

Public schools

Pupils in the Radnor Township portion of Wayne attend schools in Radnor Township School District, while pupils in the Tredyffrin portion attend schools in Tredyffrin/Easttown School District. Those in the northeastern portion of the community in Upper Merion Township attend the Upper Merion Area School District.

Students in Radnor Township attend Radnor High School.  Students in Tredyffrin Township attend Conestoga High School. Students in Upper Merion Township attend Upper Merion Area High School.

Catholic schools

The St. Katharine of Siena School is a Catholic K-8 grade school located in downtown Wayne operated by the Archdiocese of Philadelphia. Catholic students who live in Radnor Township as well as other towns in the Delaware Valley may choose to attend Archbishop John Carroll High School, located in the nearby community of Radnor.

Private schools
Many private schools are also located nearby including the Quaker-affiliated Shipley School in Bryn Mawr, all-boys Haverford School in Haverford and all-girls Agnes Irwin School in Rosemont, all located east of Wayne.  Another private school, Episcopal Academy, opened in 2008 to the south in Newtown Square.

The Valley Forge Military Academy and College is also located in Wayne.

Post-secondary
Nearby post-secondary institutions include Villanova University, Cabrini University and Eastern University. Valley Forge Military Academy is also a junior college.

YSC Academy

The Philadelphia Union of Major League Soccer opened its own private school called YSC Academy on September 3, 2013. The Wayne-based academy is designed for student-athletes the club aims to groom for professional soccer. The initial 32 pupils already had experience playing for one of the Union's academy and Juniors teams.

Notable people

Diane Meredith Belcher, concert organist, teacher, church musician
Robert Elmore, organist, composer, teacher
William Gilmore, Olympic rower
Mark Herzlich, football player
P.T. Ricci, lacrosse player
Kasie Hunt, journalist
Abbi Jacobson, actress
Karl Kirchwey, poet
Daylin Leach, state senator for the 17th district
Ned Martin, sportscaster
Anna Moffo, opera singer
Lisa Raymond, tennis player
Rafael Robb, economist
Jerry Spinelli, author
Larri Thomas, actress and dancer
Thomas F. Wilson, actor
Harold Wright, clarinetist
Joshua Wurman, scientist
Eric Bazilian, musician

Points of interest

Chanticleer Garden
St. Davids Church 
Wayne Hotel
Radnor Trail System
Anthony Wayne Theater - art deco-style movie theater
Eagle Village Shops
Farmer's Market
Downtown Wayne
Ardrossan Estate
Old Eagle School
Wayne Art Center, established in 1931
The Finley House

References

External links

The Suburban and Wayne Times
Chesterbrook retells the story of Wayne for the 20th century
On the History of Radnor Township and Wayne
Anthony Wayne Theatre

Philadelphia Main Line
Radnor Township, Delaware County, Pennsylvania
Unincorporated communities in Montgomery County, Pennsylvania
Unincorporated communities in Delaware County, Pennsylvania
Unincorporated communities in Chester County, Pennsylvania
Unincorporated communities in Pennsylvania